Magic Rock may refer to:

 Magic Rock Brewing, an English brewing company in Huddersfield, West Yorkshire
 Magic Rock (film), a 2001 comedy-drama film